

Hans Schmidt (14 March 1895  – 28 November 1971) was a German general during World War II.  He was a recipient of the Knight's Cross of the Iron Cross of Nazi Germany. He was also involved in protecting Pegasus Bridge, but failed as they were captured.

Awards and decorations

 Knight's Cross of the Iron Cross on 16 October 1944 as Generalleutnant and commander of 275. Infanterie-Division

References

Citations

Bibliography

 

1895 births
1971 deaths
People from Bayreuth
People from the Kingdom of Bavaria
German Army personnel of World War I
Military personnel from Bavaria
Recipients of the clasp to the Iron Cross, 1st class
Recipients of the Gold German Cross
Recipients of the Knight's Cross of the Iron Cross
Lieutenant generals of the German Army (Wehrmacht)
Reichswehr personnel
German Army generals of World War II